Scared Stiff is a 1987 Hong Kong comedy thriller film directed by Lau Kar-wing and starring Eric Tsang, Chow Yun-fat and Michael Miu.

This film has been seen as a Hong Kong take-off on the plot of the 1984 US thriller Dreamscape. A psychiatrist donates his time to help the mentally ill street people of Hong Kong. A reporter who hears about his activities accompanies him on his rounds.

Cast
 Eric Tsang as Halley Tsang Siu-wai
 Chow Yun-fat as Inspector Chow
 Michael Miu as David  Miu Tai-wai		
 Emily Chu	as Alice	
 Bowie Wu as Dr. Wu
 Anita Mui as May
 Wu Ma as Vampire hunter
 Dennis Chan as Ming
 Phillip Ko as Chow's follower	
 Sandra Ng as Judy	
 Michelle Sze-ma as Janice
 Margie Tsang as Mandy
 Yuen Wah as Wah

References

External links
 
 
Scared Stiff at Hong Kong Cinemagic

1987 films
Hong Kong comedy horror films
Hong Kong comedy thriller films
1980s comedy horror films
1980s comedy thriller films
1987 horror films
1980s Cantonese-language films
Films set in Hong Kong
Films shot in Hong Kong
1987 comedy films
1980s Hong Kong films